Edward Herman Kruse (October 22, 1918 – January 4, 2000) was an American lawyer, World War II veteran, and politician who served one term as a U.S. Representative from Indiana from 1949 to 1951.

Early life and career 
Born in Fort Wayne, Indiana, Kruse attended South Side High School in his hometown. He graduated in 1942 from the predecessor of the now Indiana University Robert H. McKinney School of Law after attending Butler University in Indianapolis, Indiana. He became a lawyer in private practice.

World War II 
served in the United States Navy from 1942 to 1945, where he attained the rank of lieutenant commander.

Congress 
Kruse was elected as a Democrat to the Eighty-first Congress (January 3, 1949 – January 3, 1951). He was an unsuccessful candidate for reelection to the Eighty-second Congress in 1950.

Later career and death 
He served as judge of Allen County Superior Court No. 2, Fort Wayne, Indiana in 1952.

He died on January 4, 2000, in Fort Lauderdale, Florida.

References

1918 births
2000 deaths
Butler University alumni
Indiana University Robert H. McKinney School of Law alumni
Politicians from Fort Wayne, Indiana
United States Navy officers
Democratic Party members of the United States House of Representatives from Indiana
20th-century American politicians